Uncommitted is XIA's first single. It consists of title track "Uncommitted" and an oriental version of the title song of his first Korean studio album Tarantallegra, which was released earlier in 2012. Both songs on this single are sung in English. The R&B track "Uncommitted" was composed by Bruce 'Automatic' Vanderveer. The oriental version of "Tarantallegra" added some Korean touch to the original song by using the traditional Korean instrument called kkwaenggwari and Xia also sang in Korean style towards the end of the song. The music video for "Uncommitted" was directed by Marc Klasfeld, featuring actress/model Stefanie Uncles and was shot in Los Angeles.

The single peaked at number 1 on South Korea's Gaon albums chart and 'Uncommitted" peaked at number 38 on the digital songs chart.

Track listing

Music videos
 "Uncommitted"

Charts

References

External links
 

JYJ songs
2012 singles
K-pop songs
2012 songs